Xipranolol is a beta blocker.

See also 
 Beta blocker

References 

Secondary alcohols
Antihypertensive agents
Beta blockers
Isopropylamino compounds
Ethers
Secondary amines